OYO Rooms (stylised as OYO), also known as OYO Hotels & Homes, is an Indian multinational hospitality chain of leased and franchised hotels, homes, and living spaces. Founded in 2012 by Ritesh Agarwal, OYO initially consisted mainly of budget hotels. As of January 2020, it has more than 43,000 properties and 1 million rooms across 800 cities in 80 countries, including India, Malaysia, the UAE, Nepal, China, Brazil, Mexico, the UK, Philippines, Japan, Saudi Arabia, Sri Lanka, Indonesia, Vietnam, and the United States.

The company's investors include SoftBank Group, Didi Chuxing, Greenoaks Capital, Sequoia India, Lightspeed India, Hero Enterprise, Airbnb and China Lodging Group.

History
In 2012, Ritesh Agarwal launched Oravel Stays to enable listing and booking of budget accommodations; he renamed the firm to OYO in 2013. OYO partnered with hotels to give similar guest experience across cities. Shortly after launching Oravel Stays, Ritesh Agarwal received a grant of $100,000 as part of the Thiel Fellowship, a two-year program from PayPal co-founder Peter Thiel.

In 2019, OYO had over 17,000 employees globally, of which approximately 8000 are in India and South Asia. OYO Hotels & Homes was a full-fledged hotel chain that leases and franchises assets. The company invests in capex, hires general managers to oversee operations and customer experience, and generates around a million job opportunities in India and South Asia alone. OYO set up 26 training institutes for hospitality enthusiasts across India in 2019.

In April 2019, the company announced the launch of OPEN programme, an initiative for its partner hotels to help them reach their business goals. It further Introduced an upgraded Co-OYO app for hotel partners to provide complete visibility on all business & customer metrics.

In June 2021, Oyo Rooms collaborated with Yatra, Airbnb, and EaseMyTrip to form the Confederation of Hospitality, Technology and Tourism Industry (CHATT), an industry body for the tourism sector of India.

In October 2021, OYO appointed paralympian Deepa Malik as an independent director on the company’s board of directors. In December 2021, OYO onboarded former State Bank of India (SBI) Chairman Rajnish Kumar as its strategic group advisor.

Funding
In September 2018, OYO raised $1 billion, of which the RoC filing for the amount of $100 million raised from Star Virtue Investment Ltd. was made on 13 February 2019.

In February 2019, OYO received $100 million funding from the Chinese vehicle-for-hire company, Didi Chuxing.

In July 2019, Ritesh Agarwal, through RA Hospitality Holdings in Cayman Islands, signed a $2 billion deal to buy back shares from existing investors, Lightspeed Venture Partners and Sequoia India, to increase his stake in the company to 30%. The company was valued at $10 billion with this deal.

In October 2019, OYO raised Series F funding of $1.5 billion led by SoftBank Group, Lightspeed Venture Partners and Sequoia India.

In July 2021, OYO closed a debt financing round of $660 million from global institutional investors to service existing loans.

In July 2021, Microsoft expressed interest to invest in OYO before its IPO and a multi-year strategic deal was signed in September 2021.

In October 2021, Oyo filed its draft red herring prospectus with the Securities and Exchange Board of India (SEBI) to raise 1.2 billion through an initial public offering.

In January 2022, more than 500 current and former employees of OYO, purchased around 3 crore shares in the company.

Financials

Acquisitions and partnerships

In March 2016, OYO acquired the team of Qlik Pass, founded by Rahul Gupta and Rishi Swami, to setup and lead its data science department.

In March 2018, OYO acquired Chennai-based service apartment operator, Novascotia Boutique Homes, to establish its presence in the service apartment and corporate executive stay segment. It further acquired Weddingz.in, a Mumbai-based online marketplace for wedding venues and vendors, marking its entry into the fragmented $40-billion wedding industry.

In 2019, OYO and Airbnb announced a strategic partnership where OYO would list their properties in the Airbnb platform. In March 2019, OYO announced a 1400 crore investment in its India and South Asia businesses to increase infrastructure, strengthen technology and internal capability. In April 2019, OYO announced a strategic global distribution partnership with Hotelbeds.

The company also announced two joint-venture with Softbank and Yahoo! Japan in 2019.

In May 2019, OYO announced the acquisition of Amsterdam-based @Leisure Group, Europe's largest vacation rental company. In July 2019, OYO announced the acquisition of Innov8, a co-working space in New Delhi. In August 2019, Oyo made its first major investment in the United States by purchasing the Hooters Casino Hotel, near the Las Vegas Strip, in partnership with US-based real estate company Highgate, for $135 million. In May 2022 OYO announced the acquisition of Europe-based company 'Direct Booker' with the transaction valuing the latter at around USD 5.5 million (over Rs 40 crore). Direct Booker has over 3,200 homes and serviced 20 lakh customers so far, OYO said in a statement.

Products and services
OYO Rooms has a multi-brand approach. These include:
 OYO Townhouse, which is promoted as the neighbourhood hotel is in the midscale segment targeted at millennial travellers.
 OYO Home, which OYO claims was India's maiden home management system that offers private homes in different locations and are fully managed by OYO.
 OYO Vacation Homes, which identifies itself as the world's 3rd largest vacation home brand with vacation rental management brands Belvilla, Danland, and DanCenter, along with Germany-based Traum-Ferienwohnungen.
 SilverKey, caters to the needs of the corporate travellers undertaking business trips for a short or long duration.
 Capital O offers hotel booking services.
 Palette, an upper-end leisure resorts category.
 Collection O offers booking and renting services to business travelers.
 OYO LIFE is targeted at long-term rentals.
 YO! HELP is a self-help tool that offers support for check-ins, check-outs, and payments 
 Oyo 360 is a self onboarding tool to list your property on Oyo. This has been built mainly to facilitate small hotels and home-owners for a fast track onboarding process.

Criticism
In 2019, OYO planned to implement a digital register mechanism which will allow it to share customer data in real-time with the government. This was described as a threat to privacy.

OYO has been accused of using predatory pricing and not following its own agreements including threatening hotels to unilaterally change some of the clauses or not be paid.

In 2018, the company sent mass unsolicited job offer emails targeting senior- and mid-level employees of competitors.

Controversies
In November 2015, Oyo signed a term sheet to acquire Zostel's Zo Rooms in an all-stock deal which would give Zostel's founders and investors a combined 7% stake in Oyo. In February 2016, Oyo's biggest stakeholder SoftBank announced in its earnings report that the acquisition was completed. However, in October 2017, Oyo stated that the deal was called-off and the "non-binding term sheet" for the deal had expired in September 2016. Zostel claimed that the term sheet was binding and it had transferred its business to Oyo which in turn failed to transfer the 7% stake. In 2018, Zostel approached the Supreme Court of India, which appointed former Chief Justice of India, A. M. Ahmadi as the sole arbitrator to resolve the dispute. In March 2021, Ahmadi ruled that the term sheet was binding and Zostel was entitled to execute the definitive agreements in the contract. In October 2021, Zostel wrote to the Securities and Exchange Board of India, seeking a stay on Oyo's IPO and claiming that Oyo's "capital structure is not final." In February 2022, the Delhi High Court rejected Zostel's appeal for a 7% stake in Oyo.

In April 2021, the National Company Law Appellate Tribunal (NCLAT) initiated an insolvency resolution process on OYO on the basis of a hotelier's petition over a monetary dispute with the company.

See also

References

Hotel affiliation groups
Hotel chains in India
Indian companies established in 2013
Hotels established in 2013
Companies based in Gurgaon
Softbank portfolio companies
Indian brands
Hotels in India
Hospitality companies of Asia
2013 establishments in Haryana